The Worst Kept Secret Tour was the second official tour from American girl-group Fifth Harmony and the third overall. It began in Ventura, California on February 2, 2014 and ended on March 24, 2014 in Buffalo, New York. The group performed in this tour around the same time when they were opening acts for Demi Lovato's 'Neon Lights Tour'. The official poster for this tour was chosen by Fifth Harmony among many nominations submitted by fans. It was planned as an early tour for fans who were going to see the group in Demi Lovato's 'Neon Light's Tour'.

Set list
This set list is representative of every show in this tour; however, it does change in one.

"Me & My Girls"
"Better Together"
"One Wish"
"Tellin' Me"
"Who Are You"
"Honeymoon Avenue" (Ariana Grande cover)
"Leave My Heart Out of This"
"Independent Women" (Destiny's Child cover)
"Don't Wanna Dance Alone"
"Miss Movin' On"
"Anything Could Happen" (Ellie Goulding cover)

Tour dates

References

2014 concert tours
Fifth Harmony concert tours